James Te Huna (born 29 September 1981) is best known for competing in the Ultimate Fighting Championship who has been called a pioneer of New Zealand mixed martial artists. He was the first Australian-based fighter to win a UFC fight on Australian soil, and the first person to headline a UFC fight in New Zealand. He was born in Darfield, Canterbury, New Zealand, and is of Maori descent.

James has morphed into a highly respected Rugby League Contact Wrestling Coach who has already worked alongside several NRL clubs. James also founded New Wave Engage that provides Support Programs to vulnerable teens in Out-Of-Home Care (foster teenagers).

Mixed martial arts career

Early career and background

Te Huna racked up victories on the local circuit, in Australia, as well as suffering a submission loss (via shoulder dislocation) to Bellator season one middleweight champion Hector Lombard.

Te Huna defeated veteran journeyman Antony Rea whilst competing for the Cage Fighting Championship promotion. He became the Cage Fighting Championship Light Heavyweight World Champion at CFC 10 by defeating Anthony Perosh by first-round KO. Te Huna was later sanctioned by the promotion for illegally stomping on Perosh after the referee had stopped the bout.   Cage Fighting Championship promoter Luke Pezzutti issued the following statement concerning Te Huna's behaviour,  "To Anthony Perosh and the supporters/ Fans of Cage Fighting Championship, we apologize and do not condone nor tolerate the un-sportsman like actions of James Te-Huna at the CFC 10 August 21 event where the referee Ivan Walton stepped in to stop the fight between James and Anthony, and as a result of his actions that evening he has been fined 20% of his fight purse and has offered to write a letter of apology to Anthony Perosh, CFC officials and the supporters of CFC. CFC officials will amend rules, regulations to further prevent this type of behavior from our athletes." A formal letter of apology was duly issued on Te Huna's behalf.

Te Huna escaped serious injuries after a twenty-foot shop glass panel fell on top of him while walking to training alongside a Sydney mall.

Ultimate Fighting Championship
Te Huna then signed a contract with the Ultimate Fighting Championship and made his debut at UFC 110 against Igor Pokrajac. Te Huna was victorious via a controversial TKO stoppage. The referee stopped the bout when he hit Pokrajac with nine consecutive punches, which he did with his broken arm.

His next fight was scheduled to be at UFC 120 against UFC newcomer Tom Blackledge, but Te Huna withdrew from the fight due to injury and was replaced by James McSweeney.

Te Huna made his return on 27 February 2011 at UFC 127 against Alexander Gustafsson, where was defeated by first-round submission due to a rear-naked choke. He donated his fight purse to the Christchurch earthquake victims, and the UFC matched his donation.

He faced Ricardo Romero on 24 September 2011 at UFC 135 and won by KO due to punches 47 seconds into the first round.

Te Huna next faced Aaron Rosa on 3 March 2012 at UFC on FX 2. He won by TKO in the first round.

He was expected to face UFC veteran Brandon Vera on 11 July 2012 at UFC on Fuel TV 4. However, Vera was tapped to fight Maurício Rua at UFC on Fox 4 and was replaced by returning veteran Joey Beltran. Te Huna knocked Beltran down once and had him rocked throughout the first round. Despite breaking bones in his left hand and left foot and having his endurance tested, Te Huna won the fight via unanimous decision (30–26, 30–27, 30–27).

Te Huna fought Ryan Jimmo on 16 February 2013 at UFC on Fuel TV: Barão vs. McDonald. He survived an early scare in round one after getting hit with a head kick. Te Huna then rebounded by controlling rounds two and three with his wrestling, winning via unanimous decision (29–27, 29–28, 29–28).

He next faced Glover Teixeira at UFC 160 on 25 May 2013, coming in as an injury replacement for Ryan Bader. He lost the fight via submission due to a guillotine choke in the first round.

Te Huna faced Maurício Rua on 7 December 2013 at UFC Fight Night 33. He lost the fight via knockout in the first round.

Following those two consecutive losses, Te Huna announced that he would drop down to middleweight for his future fights. He made his middleweight debut and faced Nate Marquardt in his home country of New Zealand on 28 June 2014 at UFC Fight Night: Te Huna vs. Marquardt. He lost the fight via first round armbar.

After being sidelined for all of 2015 due to a litany of injuries, Te Huna returned to face Steve Bossé on 20 March 2016 at UFC Fight Night 85. Te-Huna lost the bout via KO in the first round.

On 24 May 2016 Te Huna announced on both his Instagram and Twitter accounts that he would be retiring from mixed martial arts.

Championships and accomplishments
Ultimate Fighting Championship
 Most Significant Strikes thrown in UFC History - 2012
 First New Zealander to compete in the UFC
 First New Zealander to Win a fight in the UFC
Fight of the Night (One time)
Cage Fighting Championships
CFC Light Heavyweight World Championship (One time)
CFC Light Heavyweight Grand Prix Champion

Mixed martial arts record

| Loss
| align=center| 16–9
| Steve Bossé
| KO (punch)
| UFC Fight Night: Hunt vs. Mir
| 
| align=center|1
| align=center|0:52
| Brisbane, Queensland, Australia
| 
|-
| Loss
| align=center| 16–8
| Nate Marquardt
| Submission (armbar)
| UFC Fight Night: Te Huna vs. Marquardt
| 
| align=center| 1
| align=center| 4:34
| Auckland, New Zealand
| 
|-
| Loss
| align=center| 16–7
| Maurício Rua
| KO (punch)
| UFC Fight Night: Hunt vs. Bigfoot
| 
| align=center| 1
| align=center| 1:03
| Brisbane, Queensland, Australia
| 
|-
| Loss
| align=center| 16–6
| Glover Teixeira
| Submission (guillotine choke)
| UFC 160
| 
| align=center| 1
| align=center| 2:38
| Las Vegas, Nevada, United States
| 
|-
| Win
| align=center| 16–5
| Ryan Jimmo
| Decision (unanimous)
| UFC on Fuel TV: Barão vs. McDonald
| 
| align=center| 3
| align=center| 5:00
| London, England, United Kingdom
| 
|-
| Win
| align=center| 15–5
| Joey Beltran
| Decision (unanimous)
| UFC on Fuel TV: Munoz vs. Weidman
| 
| align=center| 3
| align=center| 5:00
| San Jose, California, United States
| 
|-
| Win
| align=center| 14–5
| Aaron Rosa
| TKO (punches)
| UFC on FX: Alves vs. Kampmann
| 
| align=center| 1
| align=center| 2:08
| Sydney, New South Wales, Australia
| 
|-
| Win
| align=center| 13–5
| Ricardo Romero
| KO (punches)
| UFC 135
| 
| align=center| 1
| align=center| 0:47
| Denver, Colorado, United States
| 
|-
| Loss
| align=center| 12–5
| Alexander Gustafsson
| Submission (rear-naked choke)
| UFC 127
| 
| align=center| 1
| align=center| 4:27
| Sydney, New South Wales, Australia
| 
|-
| Win
| align=center| 12–4
| Igor Pokrajac
| TKO (punches)
| UFC 110
| 
| align=center| 3
| align=center| 3:26
| Sydney, New South Wales, Australia
| 
|-
| Win
| align=center| 11–4
| Anthony Perosh
| KO (punches)
| CFC 10: Light Heavyweight Grand Prix Finals
| 
| align=center| 1
| align=center| 2:21
| Sydney, New South Wales, Australia
| 
|-
| Win
| align=center| 10–4
| Priscus Fogagnolo
| TKO (punches)
| CFC 9: Fighters Paradise
| 
| align=center| 2
| align=center| 2:37
| Gold Coast, Queensland, Australia
| 
|-
| Win
| align=center| 9–4
| Antony Rea
| TKO (punches)
| CFC 8: Light Heavyweight Grand Prix
| 
| align=center| 1
| align=center| 1:52
| Sydney, New South Wales, Australia
| 
|-
| Win
| align=center| 8–4
| David Gibb
| TKO (punches)
| XFC: Return of the Hulk
| 
| align=center| 1
| align=center| N/A
| Perth, Western Australia, Australia
| 
|-
| Win
| align=center| 7–4
| Sam Brown
| Decision (unanimous)
| EFG: Weapons of Mass Destruction
| 
| align=center| 3
| align=center| 5:00
| Penrith, New South Wales, Australia
|Return to Light Heavyweight.
|-
| Loss
| align=center| 6–4
| Hector Lombard
| TKO (shoulder injury)
| Warriors Realm 8
| 
| align=center| 1
| align=center| 3:50
| Geelong, Victoria, Australia
| 
|-
| Win
| align=center| 6–3
| Takahiro Oba
| TKO (corner stoppage)
| X-plosion
| 
| align=center| 2
| align=center| 5:00
| Sydney, New South Wales, Australia
|Return to Middleweight.
|-
| Loss
| align=center| 5–3
| James Lee
| Submission (rear-naked choke)
| KOTC: Gunfather
| 
| align=center| 1
| align=center| 1:37
| Sunshine Coast, Queensland, Australia
| 
|-
| Win
| align=center| 5–2
| Edwin Aguilar
| TKO (punches)
| Kumite 2
| 
| align=center| 2
| align=center| N/A
| Sydney, New South Wales, Australia
| 
|-
| Win
| align=center| 4–2
| Adrian Leatuna
| TKO (punches)
| Kumite 1
| 
| align=center| 3
| align=center| N/A
| Sydney, New South Wales, Australia
| 
|-
| Loss
| align=center| 3–2
| Matt Knight
| DQ (fence grabbing)
| KOTC: Australia
| 
| align=center| 1
| align=center| 4:01
| Sydney, New South Wales, Australia
|Middleweight debut.
|-
| Win
| align=center| 3–1
| Kym Robinson
| Submission (rear-naked choke)
| XFC 6: Ultimate Fighting Returns
| 
| align=center| 1
| align=center| 2:19
| Gold Coast, Queensland, Australia
| 
|-
| Win
| align=center| 2–1
| Rocky Huni
| Submission (rear-naked choke)
| XFC 5: When Worlds Collide
| 
| align=center| 1
| align=center| N/A
| Gold Coast, Queensland, Australia
| 
|-
| Win
| align=center| 1–1
| Matt Knight
| Submission (rear-naked choke)
| Xtreme Fight Club 2
| 
| align=center| 2
| align=center| 1:20
| Gold Coast, Queensland, Australia
| 
|-
| Loss
| align=center| 0–1
| Api Hemara
| Submission (armbar)
| Spartan Reality Fight 6
| 
| align=center| 1
| align=center| 2:20
| Perth, Western Australia, Australia
|

See also
 List of current UFC fighters
 List of male mixed martial artists

References

External links

Official UFC Profile

Living people
1981 births
New Zealand male mixed martial artists
New Zealand wrestlers
New Zealand practitioners of Brazilian jiu-jitsu
Light heavyweight mixed martial artists
Mixed martial artists utilizing boxing
Mixed martial artists utilizing wrestling
Mixed martial artists utilizing Brazilian jiu-jitsu
People from Darfield, New Zealand
New Zealand expatriate sportspeople in Australia
New Zealand Māori sportspeople
Ultimate Fighting Championship male fighters